In functional analysis, the dual norm is a measure of size for a continuous linear function defined on a normed vector space.

Definition

Let  be a normed vector space with norm  and let  denote its continuous dual space.

where  and  denote the supremum and infimum, respectively. 
The constant  map is the origin of the vector space  and it always has norm  

Importantly, a linear function  is not, in general, guaranteed to achieve its norm  on the closed unit ball  meaning that there might not exist any vector  of norm  such that  (if such a vector does exist and if  then  would necessarily have unit norm ). 
R.C. James proved James's theorem in 1964, which states that a Banach space  is reflexive if and only if every bounded linear function  achieves its norm on the closed unit ball. 
It follows, in particular, that every non-reflexive Banach space has some bounded linear functional that does not achieve its norm on the closed unit ball. 
However, the Bishop–Phelps theorem guarantees that the set of bounded linear functionals that achieve their norm on the unit sphere of a Banach space is a norm-dense subset of the continuous dual space. 

The dual norm is a special case of the operator norm defined for each (bounded) linear map between normed vector spaces. 
The topology on  induced by  turns out to be stronger than the weak-* topology on

The double dual of a normed linear space

There is a natural map . Indeed, for each  in  define

The map  is linear, injective, and distance preserving.

In general, the map  is not surjective. For example, if  is the Banach space  consisting of bounded functions on the real line with the supremum norm, then the map  is not surjective. (See  space). If  is surjective, then  is said to be a reflexive Banach space. If  then the space  is a reflexive Banach space.

Examples

Dual norm for matrices

The  defined by

is self-dual, i.e., its dual norm is 

The , a special case of the induced norm when , is defined by the maximum singular values of a matrix, that is,

has the nuclear norm as its dual norm, which is defined by 
 
for any matrix  where  denote the singular values.

If  the Schatten -norm on matrices is dual to the Schatten -norm.

Finite-dimensional spaces
Let  be a norm on  The associated dual norm, denoted  is defined as

(This can be shown to be a norm.)

From the definition of dual norm we have the inequality

which holds for all  and  The dual of the dual norm is the original norm: we have  for all  (This need not hold in infinite-dimensional vector spaces.)

The dual of the Euclidean norm is the Euclidean norm, since

The dual of the -norm is the -norm:

and the dual of the -norm is the -norm.

More generally, Hölder's inequality shows that the dual of the -norm is the -norm, where  satisfies  that is, 

The associated dual norm is

which turns out to be the sum of the singular values,

Lp and ℓp spaces

For  -norm (also called -norm) of vector  is

In particular the Euclidean norm is self-dual since  

For  the -norm is even induced by a canonical inner product  meaning that  for all vectors  This inner product can expressed in terms of the norm by using the polarization identity. 
On  this is the  defined by

while for the space  associated with a measure space  which consists of all square-integrable functions, this inner product is 

With this inner product, this dual space is also a Hilbert spaces.

Properties

Given normed vector spaces   and  let  be the collection of all bounded linear mappings (or ) of  into  Then  can be given a canonical norm.

A subset of a normed space is bounded if and only if it lies in some multiple of the unit sphere; thus  for every  if  is a scalar, then  so that 

The triangle inequality in  shows that

for every  satisfying  This fact together with the definition of  implies the triangle inequality:

Since  is a non-empty set of non-negative real numbers,  is a non-negative real number. 

Assume now that  is complete and we will show that  is complete. Let  be a Cauchy sequence in  so by definition  as  This fact together with the relation

It can be shown that  is linear. It follows that

for sufficiently all large  Hence  so that  and  This shows that  in the norm topology of  This establishes the completeness of 
 

When  is a scalar field (i.e.  or ) so that  is the dual space  of 

Let denote the closed unit ball of a normed space  
When  is the scalar field then  so part (a) is a corollary of Theorem 1. Fix  There exists  such that

but,

for every . (b) follows from the above. The proof for (c) now follows directly.
 

If  is a bounded linear functional on a normed space  then for every vector 

where  denotes the kernel of

See also

Notes

References

External links

 Notes on the proximal mapping by Lieven Vandenberge

Functional analysis
Linear algebra
Mathematical optimization
Linear functionals